Evropljanin (The European) was a bi-weekly newsmagazine published in Serbia during the late 1990s. Launched in April 1998, it was visually modeled after the German newsmagazine Focus.

Owned by Slavko Ćuruvija and published under the "Moderni srpski nedeljnik" mantra, the magazine had a strongly independent editorial policy when it came to reporting on current events in FR Yugoslavia. At times, the magazine took a clear and direct anti-Milošević stance meaning it often found itself at odds with the highest echelons of government. That eventually led to fines and Ćuruvija's brutal murder. Notable Serbian journalists such as Aleksandar Tijanić, Ljiljana Smajlović, Goranka Matić, Dragan Babić, Bogdan Tirnanić, Voja Žanetić, Jelena Kosanić, and Dragan Bujošević (who was also editor-in-chief) wrote for Evropljanin.

What turned out to be the magazine's last issue came out on 19 March 1999.

References

1998 establishments in Serbia
1999 disestablishments in Serbia
Biweekly magazines
Defunct magazines published in Serbia
Magazines established in 1998
Magazines disestablished in 1999
News magazines published in Europe
Serbian-language magazines